Raimundas Udrakis (born 31 March 1965) is a Lithuanian-Soviet Olympic equestrian. He competed in the individual and team show jumping events at the 1988 Summer Olympics.

References

1965 births
Lithuanian male equestrians
Soviet male equestrians
Olympic equestrians of the Soviet Union
Equestrians at the 1988 Summer Olympics
Living people